The South African Hip Hop Awards (commonly abbreviated as SAHHA) are an annual hip hop award ceremony, that celebrates achievements within the South African hip hop culture, established in 2012. The awards are presented annually, and are broadcast live on SABC. The annual presentation ceremony features performances by artists, and some of the awards of more popular interest are presented in a televised ceremony.

History
The South African Hip Hop Awards (SAHHA) had their origin in 2012. It is presented by Ritual Media Group (RMG) and celebrates great achievements within the local hip hop culture by focusing on how the past has shaped the phenomenon called "SA Hip Hop". The very first ceremony was held at Alex Theatre in Braamfontein, Johannesburg and then moved to the Gold Reef City Lyric Theatre, Johannesburg. The event was initially televised on ETV, but has since moved to MTV Base and to date is on SABC 1.  

The show is known for breaking out South African Hip hop artists as most of the artists have won their first ever award at the SAHHAs such as Cassper Nyovest, iFani, Emtee, Nasty C, Khuli Chana, Stogie T, Reason and Miss Pru.

Awards
As of the 4th SAHHAs, in 2015, there are a total of thirty-one categories awarded.

Top Eight awards
These are the top nine award categories of the SAHHAs. 
 Album of the Year
 Song of the Year
 Best Freshman
 Best Collaboration
 Best Remix 
 Best Female
 Best Male 
 Best Hip Hop Radio Show
 Best Video

Categories
Top categories in the South African Hip Hop Awards are as follows:

 Album of the Year is awarded 12 months in this case to the artist and the album production team published in the previous cycle.

 Song of the Year is awarded to an artist with reference the previous cycle released album.

 Best Freshman is awarded to an artist with reference to an album or mixtape released in the previous cycle.

 Best Female is an award given to honor the outstanding achievements female artists have made in Hip hop every year

 Best Male is an award given to honor the outstanding achievements of male artists in Hip hop every year.

 Best Hip Hop Radio Show recognises excellence in South African hip hop radio shows.

 Best International Band is an award given to honor the outstanding achievements of international bands from around the continent every year.

 Best local Band is an award given to honor the outstanding achievements of local bands from around the country every year.

 Best Collaboration honors rap collaborations, R&B collaborations or Rap/Sung collaborations.

 Best Digital Sales awarded based on the total units sold, streamed, or shipped to retailers. These awards and their requirements are defined by the various certifying bodies representing the music industry in various countries and territories worldwide.

 Best Remix is an honor presented to artists for quality remixed recordings.

 Producer of the Year is awarded to producers for producing the most acclaimed song or album in the year under review

 Video of the Year is given to the most popular music video released the same or previous year of the year the awards are handed out. The award is only given to the performing artist(s) or group in the video. The award is not handed out to the video directors and producers.

 Mixtape of the Year is awarded for a  mixtape , compilation , Album by DJ.

 DJ of the Year is awarded to the  DJ who has contributed immensely to South African Hip Hop in the past 12 months.

 Lyricist of the Year is awarded to recognise a lyricist who has delivered an outstanding performance in a song.

 Promoter of the Year is awarded to a promoter with most impactful Hip Hop events in the past 12 months.

Special Awards
 Hononary Award is a lifetime achievement award to individuals who have contributed in the development of South African Hip Hop.

 Milestone Award is an achievement award for individuals who have accomplished within South African Hip Hop.

 Most Valuable Player is awarded to the artist who has most acquired in monetary terms through achievements or endorsements in hip hop.

Eligibility and entry
As per the committee guidelines, only citizens and permanent residents of South Africa are eligible for a nomination. Entries are made online and a physical copy of the work is sent to the SAHHAs. Once a work is entered, reviewing sessions are held, involving the advisory board, to determine whether the work is entered in the correct category and with the exception of the Honorary award and Song of The Year award, using their expert knowledge and prior artist acknowledgements and achievements so that they can be judged on merit. The resulting lists of eligible entries are circulated to Voting Members, each of whom may vote to nominate in the general fields (Record of the Year, Album of the Year, Song of the Year, and Best Freshman) and in no more than nine out of 30 other fields on their ballots. The five recordings that earn the most votes in each category become the nominees. An audit company then calculates the results on which the list of nominees is based and certifies that end results have been reached in accordance with aforementioned rules.

Trophy

Winners receive a statue called "The Pyramid". The statue shows printed Africa in the middle with two little statue artists climbing the pyramid and reaching for the stars.

Voting
Voting is based completely on judges’ scores in the following categories: 
Album of the Year
Best Dance Crew
Best DJ
Best Freshman
Best International Brand
Best Local Brand
MVP/Hustler of the Year
Lyricist of the Year 
Mixtape of the Year 
Best Remix
Producer of the Year
Promoter of the Year

Voting depends on the judges' scores and open votes (60% judges and 40% open) for the Top 5 categories: 
Best Collaboration
Best Female
Best Male 
Best Video 
Song of the Year

Voting is completely based on online votes for the following category: 
Best Hip Hop Radio Show

Public voting
The winners of the following SAHHAs are not chosen by a panel of judges:
 Best Collaboration
 Best Remix 
 Best Female
 Best Hip Hop Radio Show
 Best Male
 Best Video 
 Song of the Year

Judging criteria
Nominations are made in accordance to an album release and image of a band or an individual. Contenders are judged on performances and achievements made in the previous year between 15th September the previous year and 15th September the following year.

Ceremonies
The first awards ceremony was in 2012, there have been 11 editions to date.

Notable moments and controversies

AKA distancing himself from the event (2012)
At the 1st South African Hip hop Music Awards, hip hop artist AKA released a statement distancing himself from the event because of a lack of communication and mismanagement, because he had eight nominations he felt that he should have been asked to perform at the event something which was meant specifically to promote the genre he represented mostly. Due to those reasons, he withdrew himself from the awards and did not wish to participate.

K.O and Kid X excluded in the nominees for the SA Hip Hop Awards (2014)
In 2014, rapper K.O and Kid X had effectively been excluded from the nomination list of the 2014 South African Hip Hop Awards. It was thought that the duo were snubbed despite their single garnering one million views on YouTube and blazing local charts for weeks on end. However, the SA Hip hop awards organisers took to Twitter to set the record straight and said that Cashtime Life had asked to be excluded from the nominees and they had "kindly obliged".

Nasty C snubbing the SA Hip-Hop Awards (2017)
In 2017, rapper Nasty C did not submit his music for consideration in the 2017 South African Hip-Hop Awards as he believed the organisation did not properly acknowledge his success.

South African Hip Hop Awards honouring HHP, Ben Sharpa & ProKid (2018)
The 7th annual ceremony which took place on Wednesday, the 19th of December at The Lyric Theatre, Gold Reef City, Johannesburg. Hip Hop masses that were in attendance were entertained with special tributes to Ben Sharpa, Pro Kid and HHP.

References

External links
South African Hip Hop Awards website

Hip hop awards
Awards established in 2012
Annual events in South Africa 
South African music awards